Rodin Thoma (born ) is a Nauruan male weightlifter, competing in the 94 kg category and representing Nauru at international competitions. He competed at world championships, most recently at the 1999 World Weightlifting Championships.

Major results

References

1979 births
Living people
Nauruan male weightlifters
Place of birth missing (living people)